Fluminicola  may refer to:
 Fluminicola (gastropod), a genus of minute freshwater snails in the family Lithoglyphidae
 Fluminicola (fungus), a genus of fungi in the family Papulosaceae